Sunnyside is a neighborhood in the western portion of the New York City borough of Queens. It shares borders with Hunters Point and Long Island City to the west, Astoria to the north, Woodside to the east and Maspeth to the south. It contains the Sunnyside Gardens Historic District, one of the first planned communities in the United States.

The name "Sunnyside" originates with the Bragaw family, French Huguenots who had purchased the land in 1713 and named their estate "Sunnyside Hill". Sunnyside was a rural hamlet mostly consisting of small farms and marshland. It was incorporated into Long Island City in 1870, and developed into a bedroom community after the Queensboro Bridge was completed in 1909. A large portion of the neighborhood is six-story apartment buildings constructed during the 1920s and 1930s.

Sunnyside is located in Queens Community District 2 and its ZIP Codes are 11101, 11104, and 11377. It is patrolled by the New York City Police Department's 108th Precinct. Politically, Sunnyside is represented by the New York City Council's 26th District.

Demographics

Based on data from the 2010 United States Census, the population of Sunnyside was 63,271, a change of 1,324 (2.1%) from the 61,947 counted in 2000.

The racial makeup of the neighborhood was 35.4% (22,424) non-Hispanic White, 2.5% (1,588) African American, 0.2% (109) Native American, 24.3% (15,390) Asian, 0%(29) Pacific Islander, 0.6% (395) other races, 2.1% (1,342) two or more races, and 34.8% (21,994) Hispanic or Latino of any race.

The entirety of Community Board 2, which comprises Sunnyside and Woodside, had 135,972 inhabitants as of NYC Health's 2018 Community Health Profile, with an average life expectancy of 85.4 years. This is higher than the median life expectancy of 81.2 for all New York City neighborhoods. Most inhabitants are middle-aged adults and youth: 17% are between the ages of 0–17, 39% between 25–44, and 24% between 45–64. The ratio of college-aged and elderly residents was lower, at 8% and 12% respectively.

As of 2017, the median household income in Community Board 2 was $67,359. In 2018, an estimated 20% of Sunnyside and Woodside residents lived in poverty, compared to 19% in all of Queens and 20% in all of New York City. One in twenty residents (5%) were unemployed, compared to 8% in Queens and 9% in New York City. Rent burden, or the percentage of residents who have difficulty paying their rent, is 51% in Sunnyside and Woodside, about equal to the boroughwide and citywide rates of 53% and 51% respectively. Based on this calculation, Sunnyside and Woodside is considered to be high-income relative to the rest of the city and not gentrifying.

Queens is one of the most ethnically diverse urban areas in the world. Sunnyside's residents are also ethnically diverse and include people of Albanian, Algerian, Argentine, Armenian, Bangladeshi, Bosnian, Bulgarian, Burmese, Chinese, Colombian, Dominican, Ecuadorian, Egyptian, Filipino, French, German, Greek, Hungarian, Indian, Iraqi, Irish, Israeli, Italian, Japanese, Korean, Lebanese, Mexican, Moroccan, Nepali, Nicaraguan, Pakistani, Paraguayan, Peruvian, Polish, Puerto Rican, Romanian, Russian, Salvadoran, Thai, Tibetan, Tunisian, Turkish, Ukrainian, Vietnamese and Yemeni ancestry. Sunnyside has a variety of ethnic cuisine, which is showcased during an annual springtime food festival called Taste of Sunnyside where people can sample cuisines from local restaurants.

As according to the 2020 census from the New York City Department of City Planning the neighborhood were approximately equally populated by White, Hispanic, and Asian populations with each of them being between 10,000 to 19,999 residents, however there were less than 5000 Black residents.

Police and crime
Woodside, Sunnyside, and Long Island City are patrolled by the 108th Precinct of the NYPD, located at 5-47 50th Avenue. The 108th Precinct ranked 25th safest out of 69 patrol areas for per-capita crime in 2010. , with a non-fatal assault rate of 19 per 100,000 people, Sunnyside and Woodside's rate of violent crimes per capita is less than that of the city as a whole. The incarceration rate of 163 per 100,000 people is lower than that of the city as a whole.

The 108th Precinct has a lower crime rate than in the 1990s, with crimes across all categories having decreased by 88.2% between 1990 and 2018. The precinct reported 2 murders, 12 rapes, 90 robberies, 108 felony assaults, 109 burglaries, 490 grand larcenies, and 114 grand larcenies auto in 2018.

Fire safety 

Sunnyside is served by the following New York City Fire Department (FDNY) fire stations:
 Engine Co. 325/Ladder Co. 163–41-24 51st Street
 Engine Co. 259/Ladder Co. 128/Battalion 45–33-51 Greenpoint Avenue

Health
, preterm births are more common in Sunnyside and Woodside than in other places citywide, but births to teenage mothers are less common. In Sunnyside and Woodside, there were 90 preterm births per 1,000 live births (compared to 87 per 1,000 citywide), and 14.9 births to teenage mothers per 1,000 live births (compared to 19.3 per 1,000 citywide). Sunnyside and Woodside has a high population of residents who are uninsured. In 2018, this population of uninsured residents was estimated to be 16%, which is higher than the citywide rate of 12%.

Fourteen percent of Sunnyside and Woodside residents are smokers, which is equal to the city average of 14% of residents being smokers. In Sunnyside and Woodside, 20% of residents are obese, 9% are diabetic, and 23% have high blood pressure—compared to the citywide averages of 20%, 14%, and 24% respectively. In addition, 19% of children are obese, compared to the citywide average of 20%.

Ninety-two percent of residents eat some fruits and vegetables every day, which is higher than the city's average of 87%. In 2018, 79% of residents described their health as "good," "very good," or "excellent," slightly higher than the city's average of 78%. For every supermarket in Sunnyside and Woodside, there are 17 bodegas.

The nearest large hospitals in the area are the Elmhurst Hospital Center in Elmhurst and the Mount Sinai Hospital of Queens in Astoria.

Post office and ZIP Codes
Sunnyside is covered by three ZIP Codes. The area west of 39th Street is covered by 11101, while Sunnyside Gardens is located in 11104, and the area east of 45th Street is inside 11377. The United States Post Office operates the Sunnyside Station at 45-15 44th Street.

Education 

Sunnyside and Woodside generally has a slightly higher ratio of college-educated residents than the rest of the city . While 45% of residents age 25 and older have a college education or higher, 19% have less than a high school education and 35% are high school graduates or have some college education. By contrast, 39% of Queens residents and 43% of city residents have a college education or higher. The percentage of Sunnyside and Woodside students excelling in math rose from 40% in 2000 to 65% in 2011, and reading achievement rose from 45% to 49% during the same time period.

Sunnyside and Woodside's rate of elementary school student absenteeism is less than the rest of New York City. In Sunnyside and Woodside, 11% of elementary school students missed twenty or more days per school year, lower than the citywide average of 20%. Additionally, 86% of high school students in Sunnyside and Woodside graduate on time, more than the citywide average of 75%.

Schools
Sunnyside contains the following public schools:

 PS 150 Sunnyside (grades PK-6)
 PS 199 Maurice A Fitzgerald (grades PK-5)
 IS 125 Thomas J McCann Woodside (grades 6-8)
 Robert F Wagner Junior Secondary School-Arts and Technology (grades 6-12)
 PS 343 The Children's Lab School (grades K-5)
 Academy of Finance and Enterprise (grades 9-12)
 Aviation Career & Technical Education High School(grades 9-12)
 Queens Vocational and Technical High School (grades 9-12)

Library
The Queens Public Library's Sunnyside branch is located at 43-06 Greenpoint Avenue.

Community organizations
 Sunnyside Community Services - 43-31 39th Street
 Sunnyside Chamber of Commerce

Houses of worship
There are numerous churches and temples in Sunnyside that support its diverse religious communities. 
 New York Presbyterian Church, located at 43-23 37th Avenue, is historically notable; the original structure was built in 1932 as the Knickerbocker Laundry Factory.
 Mosaic West Church and Community Center, located at 46-01 43rd Avenue. During the COVID-19 pandemic in New York City, local business owner Sofia Moncayo led a volunteer-run food pantry at the church.  
 Islamic Institute of New York, located at 55-11 Queens Boulevard.
 Queen of Angels Church, located at 44-04 Skillman Avenue.

Parks and recreation
Parks in the area include:
 L/Cpl. Thomas P. Noonan Playground, located between Greenpoint Avenue, 42nd Avenue, 43rd Street, and 47th Streets. The park was acquired in 1936 and commemorates Thomas P. Noonan Jr., a local resident who was killed in an ambush during the Vietnam War and posthumously honored.
 Torsney Playground, located at Skillman Avenue and 43rd Street. It was built in the 1950s and honors George F. Torsney, a local politician and World War I veteran.
 Sabba Park, located in the median of Queens Boulevard between 48th Street and 49th Street. It honors Joe Sabba, a World War II veteran, and was founded in 1913.

Transportation

The  buses run through Sunnyside.

The area is connected to Manhattan via the Long Island Expressway and the Queens Midtown Tunnel and to Brooklyn via the Brooklyn-Queens Expressway.

Sunnyside is also known for the former Pennsylvania Railroad (now Amtrak) railyard known as Sunnyside Yard. It is a staging area for both Amtrak and New Jersey Transit trains leaving from Penn Station. The proposed East Side Access project will include a new Long Island Rail Road train station in Sunnyside at Queens Boulevard along the LIRR's Main Line (into Penn Station) will provide one-stop access for area residents to Midtown Manhattan and Grand Central Terminal.

Notable people

Notable celebrities include Johanna Magdalena Beyer, Perry Como, Nancy Walker, Benh Zeitlin, David Horowitz, Judy Holliday, Joe Spinell, James Caan and Rudy Vallee; artist Raphael Soyer, and writers and social activists such as Lewis Mumford and Suze Rotolo. William Patrick Stuart-Houston, the nephew of Adolf Hitler, lived in Sunnyside for a brief period of time before leaving for the U.S. Navy in 1944. Former pro wrestler Chris Kanyon came from Sunnyside, as did New York City police commissioner Dermot F. Shea. Anthropologist, philosopher, and UC Berkeley professor Paul Rabinow grew up in the neighborhood.

Additionally, several other people have been involved with Sunnyside's history. The Queens-grown punk rock group The Ramones played some of their earliest gigs in Sunnyside pubs during the 1970s. In the years before World War II New York Giants star Hap Moran coached a youth football team, the Mustangs, in Sunnyside Park. Legendary jazz musician Bix Beiderbecke died at 43–30 46th Street in Sunnyside, and a plaque was erected in his honor by the Greater Astoria Historical Society.

In popular culture
Notable films shot in the area include:
 The Believer
 The Opportunists
 Raising Helen
 Sleepers
 Spider-Man (some exterior scenes)
 Spider-Man: Homecoming
Sunnyside (American TV series)

See also

References

External links

 Sunnyside Chamber of Commerce
 New York Metro: 6 Affordable Neighborhoods – Sunnyside
 NYTimes: An Enclave at Once Snug and Inclusive
 Greater Astoria Historical Society
 Sunnyside Post, local news site for Sunnyside residents
 Sunnyside Neighborhood on Queens Buzz

Neighborhoods in Queens, New York
Planned communities in the United States
1713 establishments in the Province of New York
Historic districts in Queens, New York